Shinya Murofushi   is a professional mixed martial artist from Japan.  He competes in the strawweight division of Pancrase. He is ranked as the #1 contender by Pancrase as of March 2020, while Fight Matrix ranks him as the #5 strawweight of all time. He is the former Shooto flyweight (114 lbs) champion.

Martial arts career
In 2006, Shinya Murofushi became the 2006 Shooto Rookie Champion in the organization's flyweight (114 lbs) division. Murofushi was known as the #2 strawweight with his strength on the ground and improving his standup, until losing to Takeshi Sato in 2009. He was ranked top ten in his division by Shooto until moving to Pancrase.

He made his pro debut in 2006 with Shooto, when he finished Hiroyuki Ikeda by way of an armbar. He would amass a 9-3-1 record in the following six years, which would earn him a title shot versus Junji Ito. Shinya finished Ito by a rear naked choke in the first round to win the vacant Shooto Flyweight Championship. He would subsequently lose the title to Yoshitaka Naito, losing by way of a rear naked choke in the last seconds of the fifth round.

He then moved to Pancrase, debuting with the organization in 2015 during Pancrase 271, when he won a unanimous decision against Takuya Eizumi. In the following bout, at Pancrase 276, he lost to Daichi Kitakata by way of a unanimous decision. He won against Rildeci Dias by armbar at Pancrase 280 and against Seiji Ozuka by a split decision at Pancrase 289. His 3–1 record with the organization entitled him to a title shot against Mitsuhisa Sunabe, during Pancrase 295, where he lost due to a slam KO.

Championships and Accomplishments 
 2006 Shooto Rookie Flyweight Champion
Shooto
Shooto World Flyweight (114 lb) Championship (One time)

Mixed martial arts record

|-
| Loss
| align=center| 13-6-1
| Mitsuhisa Sunabe
| KO (Slam)
| Pancrase - 295
| 
| align=center| 2
| align=center| 4:11
| Tokyo, Japan
| 
|-
| Win
| align=center| 13-5-1
| Seiji Ozuka
| Decision (Split)
| Pancrase - 289
| 
| align=center| 3
| align=center| 5:00
| Tokyo, Japan
| 
|-
| Win
| align=center| 12-5-1
| Rildeci Lima Dias
| Submission (Triangle Armbar)
| Pancrase - 280
| 
| align=center| 2
| align=center| 4:01
| Tokyo, Japan
| 
|-
| Loss
| align=center| 11-5-1
| Daichi Kitakata
| Decision (unanimous)
| Pancrase - 276
| 
| align=center| 3
| align=center| 5:00
| Tokyo, Japan
| 
|-
| Win
| align=center| 11-4-1
| Takuya Eizumi
| Decision (unanimous)
| Pancrase: 271
| 
| align=center| 3
| align=center| 5:00
| Tokyo, Japan
| 
|-
| Loss
| align=center| 10-4-1
| Yoshitaka Naito
| Submission (rear-naked choke)
| Shooto: 7th Round 2014
| 
| align=center| 5
| align=center| 4:57
| Tokyo, Japan
| 
|-
|-
| Win
| align=center| 10-3-1
| Junji Ito
| Technical Submission (rear-naked choke)
| Shooto: 1st Round 2014
| 
| align=center| 1
| align=center| 3:33
| Tokyo, Japan
| 
|-
| Win
| align=center| 9-3-1
| Tatsuya Yamamoto
| Submission (rear-naked choke)
| Shooto: 12th Round
| 
| align=center| 2
| align=center| 3:48
| Tokyo, Japan
| 
|-
| Win
| align=center| 8-3-1
| Yusei Shimokawa
| Decision (unanimous)
| Shooto: Gig Tokyo 11
| 
| align=center| 3
| align=center| 5:00
| Tokyo, Japan
| 
|-
| Win
| align=center| 7-3-1
| Masayoshi Kato
| Submission (hammerlock)
| Shooto: The Rookie Tournament 2011 Final
| 
| align=center| 2
| align=center| 3:15
| Tokyo, Japan
| 
|-
| Loss
| align=center| 6-3-1
| Mikihito Yamagami
| Decision (majority)
| Shooto: The Way of Shooto 6: Like a Tiger, Like a Dragon
| 
| align=center| 2
| align=center| 5:00
| Tokyo, Japan
| 
|-
| Win
| align=center| 6-2-1
| Takehiro Harusaki
| Submission (rear-naked choke)
| Shooto: Kitazawa Shooto Vol. 3
| 
| align=center| 3
| align=center| 2:29
| Tokyo, Japan
| 
|-
| Loss
| align=center| 5-2-1
| Noboru Tahara
| TKO (punches)
| Shooto: Shooting Disco 9: Superman
| 
| align=center| 1
| align=center| 4:09
| Tokyo, Japan
| 
|-
| Loss
| align=center| 5-1-1
| Takeshi Sato
| Submission (rear-naked choke)
| Shooto: Gig Tokyo 1
| 
| align=center| 1
| align=center| 1:14
| Tokyo, Japan
| 
|-
| Win
| align=center| 5-0-1
| Takehiro Harusaki
| Decision (unanimous)
| Shooto: Shooto Tradition 2
| 
| align=center| 3
| align=center| 5:00
| Tokyo, Japan
| 
|-
| Win
| align=center| 4-0-1
| Atsushi Takeuchi
| Decision (split)
| Shooto: Back To Our Roots 5
| 
| align=center| 2
| align=center| 5:00
| Tokyo, Japan
| 
|-
| Draw
| align=center| 3-0-1
| Kenichi Sawada
| Draw
| Shooto: Back To Our Roots 3
| 
| align=center| 2
| align=center| 5:00
| Tokyo, Japan
| 
|-
| Win
| align=center| 3-0
| Takehiro Ishii
| KO (knee)
| Shooto: Back To Our Roots 2
| 
| align=center| 1
| align=center| 1:33
| Tokyo, Japan
| 
|-
| Win
| align=center| 2-0
| Hiroaki Takezawa
| Submission (armbar)
| Shooto: Rookie Tournament Final
| 
| align=center| 1
| align=center| 2:36
| Tokyo, Japan
| 
|-
| Win
| align=center| 1-0
| Hiroyuki Ikeda
| Submission (armbar)
| Shooto 2006: 10/1 in Kitazawa Town Hall
| 
| align=center| 2
| align=center| 2:03
| Tokyo, Japan
|

References

External links

Japanese male mixed martial artists
Strawweight mixed martial artists
Living people
1983 births